Joseph Louis Irenée Jean Abadie (15 December 1873, Tarbes – 1934) was a French neurologist who is remembered for naming Abadie's symptom.

Brief biography 
Joseph Louis Irenée Jean Abadie was born in 1873 in Tarbes, département Hautes-Pyrénées, France. He studied medicine at the University of Bordeaux, qualifying in 1900. In 1918 he became professor of neurology and psychiatry at Bordeaux. His work included the study of tabes dorsalis and alcoholism. He died in 1934.

External links 

1873 births
1934 deaths
People from Tarbes
French neurologists
French psychiatrists